Marine World may refer to:

 Six Flags Discovery Kingdom, formerly "Marine World", in 	Vallejo, California
 Marine World/Africa USA, formerly "Marine World", in Redwood Shores, California, before relocating to Vallejo
 uShaka Marine World, Durban, South Africa
 Marine World Uminonakamichi, an aquarium in Fukuoka, Japan
 Wildlife Park 2: Marine World, a 2007 expansion pack for the video game Wildlife Park 2

See also
Marineland (disambiguation)
Sea World (disambiguation)
Water World (disambiguation)
Water planet (disambiguation)